Six-Pack of Love is an album by American singer-songwriter Peter Case, released in 1992. The song "Dream About You" reached number 16 on the Modern Rock Tracks chart. It was Case's last album for Geffen Records.

Critical reception

Music critic Denise Sullivan of AllMusic called the album "a failed attempt at expanding his folk roots and augmenting it with the tricky production of Mitchell Froom, Case's simple songs were lost in the morass." Trouser Press considered it "a gritty pop record on which [Case] plays a lot of piano, displays a John Lennon-ish voice and circles around the threat of romance as warily as an alley cat coming across a dead body."

Track listing
"Vanishing Act" (Peter Case, Tonio K) – 3:33
"Deja Blues" (Case) – 3:47
"Dream About You" (Case, Andrew Williams) – 3:02
"When You Don't Come" (Case, Fontaine Brown) – 3:53
"Never Comin' Home" (Case) – 2:11
"It's All Mine" (Case, Tony Kenny) – 3:53
"Why Don't We Give It a Go?" (Case, Swan) – 2:13
"Why?" (Case, Tonio K.) – 3:39
"Last Time I Looked" (Case, Fred Koller, Diane Sherry) – 3:11
"Wonderful 99" (Case, John Prine) – 2:52
"I've Been Looking for You" (Case, Billy Swan) – 3:02
"Beyond the Blues" (Case, Bob Neuwirth, Tom Russell) – 3:57
"It Don't Matter What People Say" (Case, Koller) – 3:22

Personnel
Peter Case – vocals, guitar, piano
Gary Mallaber – drums, percussion
Mitchell Froom – keyboards
Bruce Thomas – bass
Michael den Elzen – guitar
Steven Soles – background vocals

Production
Mitchell Froom – producer
Peter Case – producer
Tchad Blake – engineer
John Paterno – assistant engineer
Tom Nellen – assistant engineer
Max Garcia – assistant engineer
Bob Ludwig – mastering
Denise Keeley – photography
Kevin Reagan – art direction
Janet Wolsborn – design

References

Peter Case albums
1992 albums
Albums produced by Mitchell Froom
Geffen Records albums